Beneath the Planet of the Apes is a 1970 American science fiction film directed by Ted Post from a screenplay by Paul Dehn, based on a story by Dehn and Mort Abrahams. The film is the sequel to Planet of the Apes (1968) and the second installment in the Planet of the Apes original film series. It stars James Franciscus, Kim Hunter, Maurice Evans, and Linda Harrison, and features Charlton Heston in a supporting role. In the film,  another spacecraft arrives on the planet ruled by apes, carrying astronaut Brent (Franciscus), who searches for Taylor (Heston).

Beneath the Planet of the Apes was released in the United States on May 26, 1970, by 20th Century Fox. The film received mixed reviews from critics. It was followed by Escape from the Planet of the Apes in 1971.

Plot
Following the events of Planet of the Apes, time-displaced astronaut Taylor and the mute Nova travel through the desert of the Forbidden Zone in search of a new life far away from Ape City. Without warning, fire shoots up from the ground and deep chasms open. Confused by this, Taylor investigates a cliff wall and disappears through it before Nova's eyes. Unable to reach him, Nova is left alone.

After being sent to search for Taylor and his crew, a second spaceship crash-lands on the Forbidden Zone. Brent, the only survivor, notes he is in the year 3955, but assumes he has travelled to another planet. After burying his Skipper, he encounters Nova and notices she is wearing Taylor's dog tags. Hoping Taylor is still alive, he rides with her to Ape City and is shocked to discover the simian civilization. The gorilla General Ursus leads a rally for the apes to conquer the Forbidden Zone and use it as a potential food source, against the objections of the orangutan Dr. Zaius. Brent is wounded by a gorilla soldier and taken by Nova to the home of the chimpanzees Cornelius and Zira, who treat his wound and tell him of their time with Taylor.

Attempting to flee the city, Brent and Nova are captured by gorillas. Ursus orders they be used for target practice, but Zira helps them escape. They hide in a cave that turns out to be the ruins of the Queensboro Plaza station of the New York City Subway. Brent realizes he is in Earth's post-apocalyptic future. After following a humming sound deeper into the tunnels, Brent becomes agitated and erratic and attempts to kill Nova, quickly stopping and backing away to another room. Entering the remains of St. Patrick's Cathedral, he finds a population of telepathic humans who worship an ancient nuclear bomb.

Brent and Nova are captured and interrogated by the telepaths. They turn out to be descendants of the human survivors of a nuclear holocaust. They mutated over generations and claim to be a peaceful society, despite using mind-control and illusion on their enemies. The mutants force Brent into revealing the apes' march on the Forbidden Zone. Their attempts to repel the invaders with illusions of fire and other horrors ultimately fail, as Zaius sees through them. With the apes closing in, the telepaths plan to detonate their "Divine Bomb" as a last resort, holding a religious ritual. During the ritual, the telepaths remove their faces to reveal horrible disfigurements of white skin, scarring and vascular varicose disease.

Brent is separated from Nova and taken to a cell where he finds Taylor. One mutant, explaining that they cannot let them leave the city alive, uses his telepathic powers to force Brent and Taylor to fight each other. Nova escapes her guard and runs to the cell, screaming her first word: "Taylor!" This breaks the mutant's concentration, freeing the astronauts from his control long enough for them to kill the mutant. Taylor recognizes the bomb's insigna "AΩ" as a "doomsday bomb", which has a cobalt casing-capable of destroying the entire planet.

The apes invade the subterranean city, making their way to the cathedral; many of the mutants are either captured, killed, or die by suicide. After Nova is killed by a gorilla in the midst of the chaos, Taylor and Brent reach the cathedral as Mendez, the telepaths' leader, is shot dead after raising the bomb into activation position. The humans attempt to stop Ursus from accidentally setting off the weapon, but Taylor is shot in the chest as his pleas to Zaius fall on deaf ears. Zaius refuses to listen and decries humanity's violence and the ruination of all things. When Brent is gunned down after killing Ursus, the mortally wounded Taylor curses Zaius as he collapses and dies bringing his hand down on the bomb's red crystal detonation switch, The bomb goes off destroying the entire planet. The final scene is Taylor's hand on the detonator and as the screen goes white a Narrator says.
"In one of the countless billions of galaxies in the universe lies a medium sized star, ....and one of its satellites. A green and insignificant planet..is now dead." The credits were silent.

Cast

 James Franciscus as Brent
 Kim Hunter as Zira
 Maurice Evans as Dr. Zaius
 Linda Harrison as Nova
 Paul Richards as Mendez
 Victor Buono as Fat Man
 James Gregory as General Ursus
 Jeff Corey as Caspay
 Natalie Trundy as Albina
 Thomas Gomez as Minister
 Don Pedro Colley as Negro
 David Watson as Cornelius
 Tod Andrews as Skipper
 Gregory Sierra as Verger
 Charlton Heston as Taylor
 Paul Frees (uncredited end narration)

Production

Development and writing
Soon after Planet of the Apes became a hit, a sequel started being considered by 20th Century Fox. Screenwriter Rod Serling was consulted, but his ideas did not interest the studio. Then the producers turned to the author of the original novel, Pierre Boulle, who wrote a draft for a sequel called Planet of the Men, where protagonist George Taylor would lead an uprising of the enslaved men to take back control from the apes as the gorilla general Ursus wants to fight humans. Boulle's script was rejected as it was felt that it lacked the "visual shock and the surprise" of the original. Associate producer Mort Abrahams then wrote story elements, and British writer Paul Dehn was hired to develop them into a script, tentatively called Planet of the Apes Revisited. Dehn implemented his trauma of the 1945 atomic bombings and the fear of nuclear warfare on the story. One of the elements thought up by Abrahams and Dehn was a half-human, half-ape child, but despite even going through make-up tests this was dropped due to the implication of bestiality. According to screenwriter Dehn the idea for Beneath the Planet of the Apes came about from the end of the first movie which suggested that New York City was buried underground.

Although Charlton Heston showed little interest in reprising his role as Taylor, studio head Richard D. Zanuck thought the actor was essential to the sequel. After some disagreement with the actor's agents, Heston agreed to briefly appear with the provision that his character be killed and that his pay go to charity. The writers decided to have Taylor disappear at the story's start and only return by the film's ending, and have a new protagonist for the major part of the story. James Franciscus accepted the role of Brent as a break from his usual TV fare.

Director Franklin J. Schaffner was invited to return to the series, but declined due to a commitment to Patton. Television and film director Ted Post was approached, and while objecting to the script for "not making a point at all", the producers asked what he did not like. Post then wrote a letter saying that "the loss of a planet is the loss of all hope". Post tried to get the other writer of the original, Michael Wilson, but a budget cut prevented him from doing so. Post and Franciscus – who wanted to help clarify the actions of and give depth to the character of Brent – spent a week rewriting the script, leading to over fifty pages of notes suggesting story ideas to fix some of the narrative problems in Paul Dehn's script.

Roddy McDowall could not return for his role in this sequel, because he was in Scotland directing Tam Lin. Actor David Watson portrayed Cornelius in this film with McDowall only appearing briefly in clips from the first film used during Beneath'''s pre-title sequence. Along with the animated series Return to the Planet of the Apes, this film is one of only two 1970s Planet of the Apes productions in which McDowall does not appear. Orson Welles was offered the role of General Ursus, but he turned it down objecting against spending all his screentime in a mask and make-up. The part ultimately went to James Gregory.

Before Zanuck was fired as studio president during production, he suggested that Post add an element suggested by Heston, the Alpha Omega doomsday bomb, to end the series. However, before the film's release, the producers were considering ideas for another sequel.

Filming
Production began in February 1969. The sequel, now titled Beneath the Planet of the Apes, had its budget reduced from $5 million to $2.5 million because Fox had suffered recently from several underperforming big-budget films, like Star!, Hello, Dolly! and Tora! Tora! Tora! Nonetheless, the studio expected the film to return Fox to profitability. Heston's parts were filmed in just eight days.  The sets of the mutants' council chamber and the temple of the bomb were redresses of the Grand Central – 42nd Street station and Harmonia Gardens sets from the film Hello, Dolly!Music
The original Apes composer, Jerry Goldsmith, was invited to write the score for the sequel, but Schaffner was using Goldsmith for Patton. Leonard Rosenman was hired to compose the score. Rosenman tried to blend Goldsmith's distinctive score with his own style, showcased in productions such as Fantastic Voyage. An official soundtrack LP was issued on the Amos Records label soon after the film's debut in 1970. For the LP, Rosenman was asked to rearrange his score for a smaller orchestra, adding contemporary elements such as electric guitar and rock percussion. These re-recorded pieces were interspersed with dialogue taken from the film. The soundtrack featured some of the leading Los Angeles studio musicians of the time, including bassist Carol Kaye and Moog pioneer Paul Beaver.

A short sequence of diegetic music features in the scene set in the ruins of St. Patrick's Cathedral, in which the telepaths are heard singing a dystopian hymn in praise of the atom bomb. For this scene, Rosenman composed a discordant setting of Cecil Frances Alexander's 1848 Christian hymn "All Things Bright and Beautiful", with the lyrics altered to pay homage to the "Bomb Almighty".

Novelization
The novelization of the film by Michael Avallone retained the original scripted ending. Brent does not kill General Ursus. Taylor confronts him and Dr. Zaius. As Taylor tries to reason with Zaius, Zaius condemns him and Ursus repeatedly shoots Taylor with his pistol; Brent's rifle empties and the gorillas kill him. Ursus is horrified, telling Zaius that he has emptied the pistol into Taylor; he should be dead, but he still lives. Knowing he is dying, Taylor (after Zaius refuses to help him) decides to stop the violence by detonating the bomb. This he does, destroying the Earth itself.

Comic book adaptations
Gold Key Comics produced an adaptation of Beneath the Planet of the Apes in 1970. This was the first comics publication in the Planet of the Apes franchise. Later, Marvel Comics published a different version in two series (b/w magazine 1974–77, color comic book 1975-76). Malibu Comics reprinted the Marvel adaptations when they had the license in the early 1990s.

In 2015 IDW Publishing produced a mini series called Planet of the Apes - The Primate Directive where the crew of the TOS Enterprise followed a Klingon ship into the universe of Beneath the Planet of the Apes which the Klingons are trying to use as a way to get around the Organian Treaty by expanding their empire into another universe.  Both crews of the Enterprise and Klingon ship become behind the scenes characters in the events of Beneath the Planet of the Apes.  A tricorder with the sling-shot effect is left behind and is used by Dr. Milo to allow the spaceship he, Cornelius, and Zira are in to travel back through time.

Release
The film opened May 26, 1970 at Loew's Beverly Theatre in Los Angeles and opened two days later at Loew's State II and Loew’s Orpheum theatres in New York and a day later at the Roosevelt Theatre in Chicago. The film was a surprise runaway success and a sequel was rushed into production. The film grossed $250,000 in its opening week from 4 theaters finishing 9th at the US box office. It reached number one in its sixth week of release with a gross of $863,500. It grossed $19 million at the U.S. and Canadian box office. According to Fox records the film required $8,100,000 in theatrical rentals to break even and by 11 December 1970 had made worldwide rentals of $13,825,000 so made a profit to the studio.

Reception
A. H. Weiler of The New York Times wrote that the film was "proof, in living color, that Heston is vulnerable and that a sequel to striking science fiction can be pretty juvenile." Variety panned the film as "hokey and slapdash," adding, "The dialog, acting and direction are substandard." Gene Siskel of the Chicago Tribune gave the film two stars out of four: Kevin Thomas of the Los Angeles Times called it a "striking, imaginative picture," adding, "Director Ted Post, writers Mort Abrahams and Paul Dehn are to be congratulated for sounding so timely a toll of doom in such an entertaining context." Gary Arnold of The Washington Post wrote that the film was:  The Monthly Film Bulletin declared: 

The film holds a 38% rating at the review aggregation website Rotten Tomatoes based on 32 reviews, with an average grade of 5.1 out of 10. The consensus states: "Beneath the Planet of the Apes'' offers more action than its predecessor -- unfortunately, at the expense of the social subtext that elevates the franchise's best entries."

See also
 List of American films of 1970

References

External links

 
 
 
 
 
 

1970 films
1970s dystopian films
1970s science fiction films
20th Century Fox films
American science fiction adventure films
American science fiction war films
American sequel films
Films about time travel
Films directed by Ted Post
Films scored by Leonard Rosenman
Fiction set in the 4th millennium
Films set in the future
Films set in New York City
Films shot in California
Films shot in Los Angeles
Films with screenplays by Paul Dehn
Planet of the Apes films
American post-apocalyptic films
Religion in science fiction
1970s English-language films
1970s American films